Henry Rutgers Beekman may refer to:
 Henry Rutgers Beekman (judge)
 Henry Rutgers Beekman (artist)

See also
 Henry Beekman, colonial American politician and landowner